Granzyme B is a serine protease that in humans is encoded by the GZMB gene. Granzyme B is expressed by cytotoxic T lymphocytes (CTL) and natural killer (NK) cells.

CTL and NK cells share the remarkable ability to recognize specific infected target cells. They are thought to protect their host by inducing apoptosis of cells that bear on their surface 'nonself' antigens, usually peptides or proteins resulting from infection by intracellular pathogens. The protein encoded by this gene is crucial for the rapid induction of target cell apoptosis by CTL in cell-mediated immune response.

See also
The Proteolysis Map
Granzyme

References

Further reading

External links
 The MEROPS online database for peptidases and their inhibitors: S01.010